Virginia Berasategui Luna (born 15 July 1975 in Bilbao, Biscay) is a Basque triathlete and duathlete who represented Spain in international competition. In 2009, Berasategui took third place at the Ironman World Championships. In March 2013, she announced that she would retire from the sport after the 2013 season.

Career
Berasategui placed second at the 1997 Europe Triathlon Championships and won four medals at the ITU Long Distance Triathlon World Championships between 1997 and 2010. Additionally, she won two medals at the European Championship in 2009 and 2010, a medal at the 2009 Ironman World Championship and three medals at the Ironman 70.3 European Championship between 2007 and 2012.

In duathlon she took third at the 1997 ITU Duathlon World Championships.

Doping
In 2005, Berasategui tested positive for EPO following her win at Ironman Lanzarote. The allegations were eventually dropped because of doubts regarding the validity of the testing for EPO at the time. Berasategui claimed "extreme high protein levels in their urine after strenuous exercise" to be the reason for the false positive.

In June 2013, it was announced that Berasategui had tested positive for doping during the Bilbao Triathlon held on 18 May 2013, an event in which Berasategui won the half distance race. One of six anti-doping controls carried out after the Bilbao race had tested positive to which Berasategui asked for a counter-analysis on. However, almost two weeks later, Berasategui confessed to the doping charges. In a statement she said that she would not appeal because she knew that she was guilty and expressed the desire to be open and honest. She apologized and stated that she made "the worst mistake in which an athlete can fall."

Notable results

References

External links
 www.3vir.com 
 ITU Profile Page

1975 births
Living people
Spanish female triathletes
Triathletes from the Basque Country (autonomous community)
Sportspeople from Bilbao
Doping cases in triathlon